Varun Parandhaman is an Indian musician and songwriter based in Chennai, Tamil Nadu. He is an independent artist/freelance singer and a music producer.

Early life

Born and brought up in Chennai, Varun Parandhaman finished his schooling at KPCVSS and studied to be a Software Engineer. He took to singing and song writing in middle school but never had any formal learning in any form of music. While pursuing a professional engineering degree, he won numerous solo singing events in the inter-college level.

Music career

While in college, he taught himself how to use popular digital audio workstations (DAWs) today such as Cubase, Nuendo, Ableton Live and more. He then became the music producer for various artists based in Chennai, and also collaborated with them.

In 2009, Varun sang the hook for the remix version of the song Kadavule Kadavule composed by music director D. Imman in the actor Jiiva starrer Kacheri Arambam.

Since then, he has been freelancing as a backup vocalist for more than 6 years. Music took a huge turn when he graduated from college. He has sung back-up for reputed music directors in the industry today such as A. R. Rahman, D. Imman, Anirudh Ravichander, Santhosh Kumar Dayanidhi, Pradeep Vijay, Sean Roldan,  Siddharth Vipin and Ved Shankar.

Also, he has always been associated with Independent Music and has worked on and recorded songs for the famous Tamil Hip Hop duo, Hiphop Tamizha.

Noticing that a Tamil boy band was non-existent in the music scenario, Varun Parandhaman decided to mentor Namma Ooru Boy Band (NOBB) and collaborate his music styles pioneering Tamil Pop.

His first venture with NOBB was the largely popular reggae style single Cosmopolitan Kadhali   for which he produced the music and vocals working along with Keba Jeremiah, Joshua Satya and Andrew Arun. The music video, released in April 2014 under the banner Divo Movies starring model Surya Ganapathy has garnered more than 600,000 views on YouTube and was premiered in the popular South Indian music channel Sun Music which predominantly plays film music in July 2014.

He has his own band, Varun Parandhaman & Friends, composed of and collaborating with prominent musicians from the film industry and they have been touring and doing shows in Bengaluru, Kerala, Erode, Yercaud and also numerous reputed venues in Chennai.

August 2014 saw Varun Parandhaman securing another huge milestone. His debut into Tamil film music, was an opportunity through music composer D. Imman in the film Sigaram Thodu   starring actor Vikram Prabhu. The song Takku Takku sung along with Anthony Daasan became a "MASS HIT" according to the papers, due to its peppy tune and quirky lyrics by Madhan Karky. This was followed by Yaar Enna Sonnaalum in Hiphop Tamizha's debut film music direction Aambala, Athana Azhagaiyum from the Santhanam starrer Inimey Ippadithaan and Sona Sona from Vasuvum Saravananum Onna Padichavanga. All his film songs have been featured in the Top 10 songs from time to time. Takku Takku starred at the #1 spot in the Tamil charts and the song Athana Azhagaiyum was at #3 and also #15 in the Top 50 songs of 2015. His most recent works were the songs Nizhala Nijama from Vellaiya Irukiravan Poi Solla Maatan,  Olarava Olarava in Darling 2,  Rain Rain Go Go from Pokkiri Raja (2016) and Wako Wowra from Meen Kuzhambum Mann Paanaiyum.

Discography

Film songs

Albums

Back-up vocals and BGM

References

Further reading
 http://www.thehindu.com/features/cinema/for-all-music-lover/article7239085.ece

External links 
 Varun Parandhaman on Facebook

Singers from Chennai
Living people
1991 births
Indian male singer-songwriters
Indian singer-songwriters